Henry Kane may refer to:

 Henry Kane (Poltergeist), a character in the film series Poltergeist
 Henry B. Kane (1902–1971), American illustrator, photographer, and author of nature books for children
 Henry Coey Kane (died 1917), Royal Navy officer
 Henry Plow Kane (1825-1893), founding headmaster at Launceston Church Grammar School, Tasmania, Australia

See also
 Harry Kane (disambiguation)